The 2013–14 Maine Black Bears men's basketball team  represented the University of Maine during the 2013–14 NCAA Division I men's basketball season. The Black Bears, led by tenth year head coach Ted Woodward, played their home games at Memorial Gym and Cross Insurance Center and were members of the America East Conference. They finished the season 6–23, 4–12 in American East play to finish in a three way tie for seventh place. They lost in the quarterfinals of the American East tournament to Stony Brook.

Roster

Schedule

|-
!colspan=9 style="background:#000050; color:#FFFFFF;"| Exhibition

|-
!colspan=9 style="background:#000050; color:#FFFFFF;"|Regular season

|-
!colspan=9 style="background:#000050; color:#FFFFFF;"| 2014 America East tournament

* The December 15 game against Maine–Presque Isle was canceled due to inclement weather.

References

Maine
Maine Black Bears men's basketball seasons
Black
Black